Thomas Jenkins (born 16 March 2001) is an Australian professional rugby league footballer who plays as a  for the Penrith Panthers in the NRL.

Background
Jenkins played his juniors with Young Cherrypickers.

Playing career
In round 25 of the 2022 NRL season, Jenkins made his debut for the Panthers against the North Queensland Cowboys.

References

External links
Penrith Panthers profile

2001 births
Australian rugby league players
Rugby league centres
Penrith Panthers players
Living people
Rugby league players from New South Wales